Leopold Katscher (1853–1939) was a Hungarian Jewish writer and peace activist. He was a strong influence on Rosika Schwimmer, his niece.

Katscher translated the works of Hippolyte Taine into German from 1877 until the early 20th century.

References

1853 births
1939 deaths
Hungarian activists
Hungarian Jews
Hungarian male writers
Hungarian translators